The 2022–23 Gibraltar Women's Football League was the seventh season of 11-a-side women's football in Gibraltar since the territory joined UEFA in 2013, and FIFA in 2016. The league had been in operation for a number of years previously, but often as a 9-a side tournament. Teams are ineligible for entry to the UEFA Women's Champions League as the league is considered a "development" tournament. Lions Gibraltar are the reigning champions from the previous season. The league kicked off on 28 September 2022, in a reduced format where teams only played each other twice, due to the scheduled demolition of Victoria Stadium to make room for the new Gibraltar National Stadium in 2023.

Teams
For the first time since the 2018–19 season, the league is unchanged from the previous season.

Note: Flags indicate national team as has been defined under FIFA eligibility rules. Players may hold more than one non-FIFA nationality.

League table

Results

Season statistics

Scoring

Top scorers

Hat-tricks

Clean Sheets

References

External links
Association website

2022–23 domestic women's association football leagues
Football leagues in Gibraltar